Flame Over Vietnam Original title: Una cruz en el infierno is a 1957 Spanish film directed by José María Elorrieta.

Plot 
A nun arrives at a religious mission in the middle of the war in China and soon becomes friend with refugee children. One day, a trafficker is injured and taken to the mission, where he falls in love with the nun.

Cast

External links

1957 films
Spanish war drama films
1950s Spanish-language films
Films set in Vietnam
Films produced by Sidney W. Pink
Films directed by José María Elorrieta
UFA GmbH
Films with screenplays by Rafael J. Salvia
1950s Spanish films